The Roxy Theatre is a movie theatre located within Warner Bros. Movie World on the Gold Coast, Australia. The theatre shows a 4D film during the general operating day of the theme park which is currently Scoob! 4D Experience. A replica exists at Movie Park Germany in Bottrop, Germany.

History
The first Roxy Theatre was installed at Warner Bros. Movie World ahead of the park's opening on 3 June 1991. A replica was later built at Movie Park Germany (which was known as Warner Bros. Movie World Germany at the time). In 2005, the theatre underwent a major refurbishment which included the installation of 4D motion seats.

Theatre
The Roxy Theatre is located in Main Street at Warner Bros. Movie World. Guests queue outside the theatre and enter a preshow room before they see their film. The preshow room then leads into the main theatre which seats 320 people. The seats which have motion capabilities were designed by FX Illusions.

Films

Premieres
A number of premieres have occurred at Warner Bros. Movie World's Roxy Theatre. These include:
 Fool's Gold
 Harry Potter and the Philosopher's Stone
 Get Smart
 Nim's Island
 Harry Potter and the Half Blood Prince
 The Fast and the Furious
 I Love You Too
 Speed Racer
 San Andreas

References

Amusement rides introduced in 1991
Cinemas in Queensland
1991 establishments in Australia
City of Gold Coast
Warner Bros. Movie World